Wim Feyaerts is a Belgian television director  who specializes in the production of comedy.

Feyaerts has directed a number of popular mainstream television comedies in Belgium such as Verschoten & zoon in 1999 and De Kotmadam with Ronnie Commissaris since 1991.

References

Flemish television directors
Living people
Year of birth missing (living people)